Andre R. Campbell is an American physician. He is a Professor of Surgery and the Vice Chair for Diversity, Equity, and Inclusion at the University of California, San Francisco.

Early life and education 
Campbell is from Queens, New York. He grew up during the civil rights movement. At the age of 13, his science teacher encouraged him to become a physician. He studied biology at Harvard University and graduated in 1980. He was a medical student at the University of California, San Francisco, and completed his medical degree in 1985. He was a medical resident specialising in internal medicine at the Columbia University Vagelos College of Physicians. After completing his first residency, Campbell switched to surgery, where he was the only Black resident.

Research and career 
In 1994, Campbell joined the faculty at the University of California, San Francisco, and worked as a physician at the San Francisco General Hospital. His research considers the treatment of trauma patients in the intensive care unit.

In 2000, Campbell was a founding member of the Haile T. Debas Academy of Medical Educators. The academy has a focus on improving health through diversity, advocacy, and innovation. He was awarded the Association for Surgical Education Education Award in 2003. In 2003 he was made Endowed Chair of Surgical Education, a 5-year post that was renewed in 2009. In 2006, Campbell and SF General Trauma were profiled in the San Francisco Chronicle article General, Life and Death at San Francisco's Hospital of Last Resort / For Trauma Team, Saving Lives is Both a Social and Medical Mission. In 2011 Campbell was recognized by the San Francisco Board of Supervisors for his service as a trauma surgeon. Throughout his career he has advocated for social justice. On Earth Day in 2017 he was part of a 'teach in' that called for more medics to be involved with policy work. He encouraged the audience to “advocate for your patients, advocate for issues you're passionate about, and advocate for institutions you believe in,”.

He serves as the Vice Chair for Diversity, Equity, and Inclusion in the UCSF Department of Surgery. He has been involved with various diversity initiatives across campus, including the White Coats for Black Lives movement that started in response to Black Lives Matter.

Campbell is an advocate for gun violence prevention. In the aftermath of the YouTube headquarters shooting, Campbell treated patients at the San Francisco General Hospital. Her delivered the UCSF School of Medicine Last Lecture, an annual lecture where the speaker is selected by the student body.

In 2018, he was elected to the Board of Governors at the American College of Surgeons. He is president elect at the Columbia University Alumni John Jones Surgical Society.

In the early days of the COVID-19 pandemic, Campbell spoke about the need for social distancing, lockdowns, and sneezing into your elbow. In early March 2020, he said that his medical team at UCSF “has moved into disaster planning mode,”.

Awards and honours 
2003 Association for Surgical Education Education Award

2010 University of California, San Francisco Martin Luther King, Jr. Award

Selected publications

References 

Living people
Year of birth missing (living people)
University of California, San Francisco faculty
People from Queens, New York
American physicians
Harvard College alumni
University of California, San Francisco alumni